In Britain and some of its former colonies, fêtes are traditional public festivals, held outdoors and organised to raise funds for a charity. They typically include entertainment and the sale of goods and refreshments.

Village fêtes

Village fêtes are common in Britain. These are usually outdoor shows held on village greens or recreation grounds with a variety of activities. They are organised by an ad hoc committee of volunteers from organisations like religious groups or residents' associations. Fêtes can also be seen in former British colonies. In Australia, fêtes are often held yearly by schools and sometimes churches to raise funds.

Attractions seen at village fêtes include tombolas, raffles, coconut shies, bat a rat stalls, white elephant stalls, cakes, and home produce such as jams and pickles. Competitive baking, such as making Victoria sponge cake, is part of the classic British fête. Filmed in bunting-draped marquees in scenic gardens, The Great British Bake Off television series is inspired by the quintessential English village fête. Entertainment at fêtes may include Morris dancing, tug of war, fancy dress, and pet shows. The fête itself is a variation of a fair.

Other types
In Trinidad and Tobago and other English-speaking Caribbean territories, fêtes are huge parties held during the Carnival season.

Harvard University's Eliot House uses the term to refer to its spring formal. Bloomington, Minnesota's, Independence Day celebration (traditionally held on 3 July) has been known as Summer Fete since 1978.

In Australia, fetes are typically held by primary schools & other not-for-profit organisations (e.g. the local Seniors' Club, church groups) as fundraisers.

Etymology
The 12th-century Middle English root fest- is shared with feast, festive, festal and festival, festoon, the Spanish , Portuguese , etc. and the proper name Festus.

See also

Kermesse
Village Fête, a painting by Claude Lorrain

References

Fairs